Proboscis is a genus of butterflies from the subfamily Satyrinae in the family Nymphalidae. The species in the genus Proboscis occur in South America.

Species
Proboscis propylea (Hewitson, 1857)
Proboscis pomarancia Pyrcz, 2004

References

Satyrini
Butterfly genera
Taxa named by Theodor Otto Thieme